ROOTDOWN is a rock band with reggae and hip-hop undertones. Formed in 2007 by American Singer-Songwriter Paul Wright, the Oregon-based group released their debut album ROOTDOWN EP in 2007.  The band is best known for the song "Taking Over Me" from their second album "Summer of Love", which charted in the top fifteen of the Air 1 radio chart.  ROOTDOWN also has other accomplishments from "Summer of Love" including rising to as high as number 6 on the iTunes top reggae albums chart. Rootdown also as of recently had a popular radio song off their album Tidalwave (2009) called "All I wanna do". They have shared the stage with such notable musicians as Pepper, Tyrone Wells, and many others.

They most recently showcased at the National Association for Campus Activities (NACA) West Conference where they were booked by over 25 college campuses in the Western region.  Rootdown tours primarily on the West coast, playing shows from San Diego to Seattle but most recently have branched out touring on the East Coast in the Spring of 2009 playing shows in Washington, DC down to Jacksonville, Florida.  In 2009, they have played at such campuses as Oregon State University, Mount Hood Community College, Corban College, CSU Monterey Bay, Northwest Christian University and Western Oregon University.

They are releasing both of their EPs as one album in Japan in the Spring of 2010 under the record label Surf Rock International based out of Japan and distributed by Pony Canyon.

History

Composition
ROOTDOWN was formed in 2007, and currently consists of Paul Wright (vocals and acoustic guitar), Matt Salinas (guitar) and Craig Paulsen (drums and percussion).

Band members

Current members
Paul Wright – vocals, acoustic guitar (2007–present)
Matt Salinas – electric guitar (2009–present)
Craig Paulsen – drums, percussion (2007–present)

Guest musicians
Tim Hemphill (founding member 2007)  – trumpet, percussion (2007–present)
Ethan Souers - Bass (2011–present)
Christian Kinyon - Electric guitar (2011–present) 
Chris Rogers – saxophone (2009)

Past members
Justin Fish – bass, vocals (founding member) (2007)
Jesiah Dzwonek – keyboard (founding member) (2007–2008)
Zane Fischer – guitar, vocals (founding member) (2007–2008)
Dylan Wages – bass (2008)
Markos Photinos – drums (2008)
Jackson Michelson - bass (2008-2011)

Discography

ROOTDOWN EP (2007)

 Real Love
 Don't Walk Away
 Pick Up Yourself
 Roots

Summer of Love (2009) 

 Sweet Love
 Summertime In The City
 Taking Over Me
 Burrito Boy
 Baby Come Back

Tidal Wave (2011)

 Good Day
 Tidal Wave
 All I Wanna Do
 Golden
 You’re Mine
 Storm Warning
 Growing Up
 HB
 Karl Malone In a Cowboy Hat
 Weekend

References

External links
 Eugene Weekly: ROOTDOWN's "Summertime"
 Corvallis Gazette Times:  Courtyard Music Festival welcomes new students with music, eats
The Advocate: Rootdown rocks New Student Orientation
ThePier.org: ROOTDOWN Artist Interview

Reggae rock groups
Alternative rock groups from Oregon
American pop music groups
Musical groups established in 2007
American Christian rock groups
Musical groups from Eugene, Oregon
2007 establishments in Oregon